You Are OK is the seventh full-length album by American rock band The Maine, released on March 29, 2019. "Numb Without You" was released as the lead single and "My Best Habit" and "Broken Parts" were the last two singles released from the album.

Background and recording
The band worked with producer Matt Squire for their seventh album You Are OK. Squire previously worked with the band on their first album, Can't Stop Won't Stop in 2008.

In December 2018, lead singer John O'Callaghan confirmed that the album had been completed. It was also revealed that guitarist Jared Monaco had almost quit the group prior to the release of You Are OK.

O'Callaghan revealed the meaning behind the name You Are OK via an Instagram post saying, “I decided to name this album those three small words for no better reason than to speak to myself.” He continues by stating, “Selfish as it may be, I need to hear those words often, and if they somehow resonate like they did with this someone across the world then I accidentally did at least a little good while I was alive. Moral is, words are more powerful than ever, use them with the utmost care.”

You Are OK won the Rock Sound "Album Of The Year" award in 2019.

Release
The album was officially released on March 29, 2019. Upon the album's release, it spawned three singles. The first and lead single, "Numb Without You" was released on January 16, 2019. On February 22, 2019, "My Best Habit" was released as the second single and a week before the albums release, their third single, "Broken Parts" was released on March 22, 2019.

Reception

Timothy Monger of AllMusic calls the album a more increasingly slick contemporary pop territory with big melodic choruses, loads of hooks, and a more varied palette of sounds. Sam Devotta of idobi praised the bands album for consistently mixing up their sound and gave the album a 10 out of 10 rating.

Track listing

Personnel
Members
 John O'Callaghan – lead vocals, piano
 Jared Monaco – lead guitar
 Kennedy Brock – rhythm guitar, vocals
 Garrett Nickelsen – bass guitar
 Patrick Kirch – drums, percussion

Charts

References

The Maine (band) albums
2019 albums